Guangzhou Baiyun railway station is a railway station currently under construction in Baiyun District, Guangzhou, Guangdong, China. It is planned to be a major transport hub in Guangzhou.

A spur from the Beijing–Guangzhou high-speed railway will connect to this station. It will also be the terminus of the planned Guangzhou–Zhanjiang high-speed railway.

History
Guangzhou Baiyun railway station is located partially on the site of the defunct , which was originally constructed in 1916. Tangxi station's northern concourse was torn down to make way for Guangzhou Baiyun station's construction.

In July 2019, it was announced that the station would start construction in September. At the time, it was expected to be complete by 2022.

On 2 October 2020, China Railway Construction Corporation won the bid to construct the station.

Guangzhou Metro
The station will be served by Guangzhou Metro lines 8 (via Shitan station), 12, 22 and 24.

References

Railway stations in Guangdong
Railway stations under construction in China